A constitutional referendum was held in Northern Cyprus on 5 May 1985. The new constitution put forward by the Assembly of the Republic removed the term limits on the President, increased the number of seats in the Assembly from 40 to 50, set details on citizenship, the national flag and the national anthem, and provided for mandatory referendums on changes to the constitution. It was approved by 70.18% of voters.

Results

References

Referendums in Northern Cyprus
1985 referendums
1985 in Northern Cyprus
Constitutional referendums
May 1985 events in Europe